Miss Sadie Thompson is a 1953 3-D American musical romantic drama film directed by Curtis Bernhardt and starring Rita Hayworth, José Ferrer, and Aldo Ray. The film was released by Columbia Pictures. The film is based on W. Somerset Maugham's 1921 short story "Miss Thompson" (later retitled "Rain"). Other film versions include Sadie Thompson (1928) starring Gloria Swanson, Rain (1932) starring Joan Crawford, and Dirty Gertie from Harlem U.S.A. (1946).

The film received a nomination for Best Original Song ("Sadie Thompson's Song") at the 26th Academy Awards.

Premise
A bar girl from Hawaii, a religious zealot, and a love-struck Marine struggle with sin and salvation just after World War II while Sadie Thompson kicks out several songs, including "Blue Pacific Blues".

Cast
 Rita Hayworth as Sadie Thompson
 José Ferrer as Alfred Davidson
 Aldo Ray as Sgt. Phil O'Hara
 Russell Collins as Dr. Robert MacPhail
 Diosa Costello as Ameena Horn
 Harry Bellaver as Joe Horn
 Wilton Graff as Governor
 Peggy Converse as Mrs. Margaret Davidson
 Henry Slate as Pvt. Griggs
 Rudy Bond as Pvt. Hodges
 Charles Bronson as Pvt. Edwards (as Charles Buchinsky)
 Frances Morri as Mrs. MacPhail

Production
In February 1952, producer Jerry Wald announced he had the film rights to the play adaptation of Rain from producer Lester Cowan. Wald had a production unit at RKO with Norman Krasna and wanted to make it as a musical in color.

In October 1953, Wald left RKO to become a vice president and executive producer at Columbia Pictures. He planned to personally produce two films a year and said one of these would be Rain. It would star Rita Hayworth, who was the biggest star at the studio. Harry Kleiner was assigned to write the script. Plans were made to shoot the film in 3-D.

This was Hayworth's third film after her marriage to Prince Aly Khan had kept her off screen for four years. The public eagerly welcomed her return in two previous films Affair in Trinidad and Salome so Columbia gave Miss Sadie Thompson an "A" film budget.

"It would give her the chance to not be glamorous", said Wald.

3-D films had become a fad, with some 3-D films drawing huge crowds in major cities, so it was used as well. Exteriors were filmed on the island of Kauai, Hawaii and interiors on the Columbia lot.

The original story of sin and redemption was sanitized to appease the Production Code and several musical numbers were inserted to spice up the tepid reworked plot. As with her previous films, Hayworth's singing was dubbed, this time by Jo Ann Greer.

In August 1953, Hayworth and Ray shot some additional romantic scenes.

By the time of the premiere on December 23, 1953, interest in 3-D had died down considerably. After a two-week run, all 3-D prints were pulled. The film was given a national release "flat", in other words, in regular prints, minus the 3-D.

The film was banned in some territories such as Memphis.

Reviews
Variety wrote, "She catches the feel of the title character well, even to braving completely deglamorizing makeup, costuming and photography to fit her physical appearance to that of the bawdy, shady lady that was Sadie Thompson". The Village Voice wrote, "Although its Hays Code sanitizing is mitigated somewhat by the glorious extravagances of 1950s cinema (it's a Technicolor, 3-D star vehicle with musical numbers), Miss Sadie Thompson (1953) is a scoured version of Rain (1932)." Bosley Crowther of The New York Times wrote, "The character of Sadie is drained of considerable point by the prudence of the producers. And Miss Hayworth is left with a role in which she is able to inject very little, outside her own particular brand of appeal".

Availability
 A dual projection polarized 3-D print of Miss Sadie Thompson was screened at The World 3-D Expo 2006 September 10, 2006 at the Egyptian Theater in Hollywood, Ca.
 A 3-D version of the trailer can be seen in the Blu-ray Collection "3-D Rarities" from Flicker Alley.
 A VHS full screen edition of Miss Sadie Thompson was released in 1994 but is no longer available.
 A DVD full screen edition of Miss Sadie Thompson was released in 2001 but is no longer available.
 Another edition of the DVD is available as part of "The Films of Rita Hayworth"  5-disc box set.
 A 3D Blu-ray is now available in the US as of July 12, 2016, from Twilight Time Movies.

References

External links
 
 
 
 

1953 films
1953 musical films
1953 romantic drama films
1953 3D films
1950s musical drama films
1950s romantic musical films
American 3D films
American musical drama films
American romantic drama films
American romantic musical films
Columbia Pictures films
Films about the United States Marine Corps
Films based on short fiction
Films based on works by W. Somerset Maugham
Films directed by Curtis Bernhardt
Films set in American Samoa
Films shot in Hawaii
Films with screenplays by Harry Kleiner
1950s English-language films
1950s American films